Frode Grytten is a Norwegian writer and journalist. Born 11 December 1960 in Bergen and a native of Odda, he is the author of the Brage Prize-winning novel Bikubesong ("Song of the Beehive") as well as other short stories and poems. His works have been translated into Swedish, Danish, Finnish, German, Dutch, French, English, Albanian, Croatian and Chinese.  

His journalism includes work for the local newspaper Bergens Tidende as well as the Oslo-based Dagbladet.

Bibliography
 1983 Start. Poems.
 1986 Dans som en sommerfugl – stikk som en bie. Short stories
 1990 Langdistansesvømmar. Short stories
 1993 80 grader aust for Birdland. (80 Degrees East of Birdland) Short stories
 1995 Meir enn regn. Short stories
 1997 Heim att til 1990–åra. Short stories
 1999 Bikubesong. Short stories.
 1999 Frosken Vertigo og det store spranget. Children's book
 2001 Popsongar. Short stories.
 2002 Dublin. Non-fiction
 2004 Hull & sønn. Children's book
 2005 Bikubegang : 24 stopp i Frode Gryttens univers Non-fiction
 2005 Flytande bjørn. Novel, winning the Norwegian Rivertonprisen crime award (published in English as The Shadow in the River, 2008)
 2007 Rom ved havet, rom i byen. Short stories written to Edward Hopper's paintings
 2009 Det norske huset
 2010 50/50, collection of essays.
 2011 Saganatt. Lundetrilogien, a trilogy of novels released together in one book.

Awards 
Brage Prize 1999, for Bikubesong
Sigmund Skard-stipendet 2000
Norsk språkpris 2003
Rivertonprisen 2005, for Flytande bjørn
Samlagsprisen 2006
Nynorsk Literature Prize 2007, for Rom ved havet, rom i byen
Melsom-prisen 2008, for Rom ved havet, rom i byen

References 

1960 births
Living people
Norwegian writers
Norwegian journalists
People from Odda
Nynorsk-language writers